KLBW (1530 AM) was a radio station broadcasting a religious radio format. Licensed to New Boston, Texas, United States, it served the Texarkana area. The station was last owned by Chapel of Light.

As of 2018, the station had been off the air for some time. The studios and transmitter facilities appear to be long since abandoned and neglected. Its license was not renewed and expired on August 1, 2021.

References

External links
FCC Station Search Details: DKLBW (Facility ID: 6559)
FCC History Cards for KLBW (covering 1967-1981 as KNBO)

LBW
LBW
Radio stations established in 1970
Radio stations disestablished in 2021
Defunct radio stations in the United States
Defunct religious radio stations in the United States
LBW
2021 disestablishments in Texas